Ch'ŏngsu station is a railway station of the Korean State Railway in Ch'ŏngsu Workers' District, Sakchu County, North P'yŏngan Province, North Korea. It is the northern terminus of the P'yŏngbuk Line of the Korean State Railway. The line continues past the station to a factory at Namsal-li.

History
Ch'ŏngsu station, along with the rest of the line, was opened by the Pyongbuk Railway on 27 September 1939.

Services
Ch'ŏngsu station is served by semi-express trains 115/116 to and from P'yŏngyang, long-distance stopping trains 200/201 to and from West P'yŏngyang, as well as six pairs of commuter trains along the Ch'ongsu–Sup'ung–P'ungnyŏn route.

References

Railway stations in North Korea